Shebenik is a large mountain located in the Shebenik-Jabllanice National Park in eastern Albania.

Geography 
It is found in the north-east of Shebenik. Around this peak are a number of small and large mountain lakes. Shebenik mountain is located west of Jablanica Mountain and northwest of Lake Ohrid. Shebenik is a great importance to wildlife preservation, especially because it is a home for the rare Eurasian lynx.

The largest settlement near Shebenik is the town of Librazhd.

Lakes

Shebenik mountain massif contains around nine small glacial lakes. The biggest of which is named Rajca Lake. It is located on the eastern slopes of the mountain and it is also the most southern lake on Shebenik. The length of Rajca Lake is around 220m and the width is around 160m.

References

Mountains of Albania
Shebenik-Jabllanicë National Park